Magnus Gustafsson was the defending champion but did not compete that year.

Thomas Johansson won in the final 6–3, 6–4 against Renzo Furlan.

Seeds

  Michael Stich (semifinals)
  Greg Rusedski (second round, withdrew)
  David Prinosil (second round)
  Daniel Vacek (second round)
  Thomas Johansson (champion)
  Karol Kučera (first round)
  Renzo Furlan (final)
  Kenneth Carlsen (quarterfinals)

Draw

Finals

Top half

Bottom half

External links
 Main draw

St. Petersburg Open
1997 ATP Tour
1997 in Russian tennis